The 2001–02 Umaglesi Liga was the thirteenth season of top-tier football in Georgia. It began on 28 July 2001 and ended on 22 May 2002. Torpedo Kutaisi were the defending champions.

Locations

First stage

League table

Results

Second stage

Championship group

Table

Results

Relegation group

Table

Results

Relegation play-offs

Top goalscorers

See also
2001–02 Pirveli Liga
2001–02 Georgian Cup

References
Georgia - List of final tables (RSSSF)

Erovnuli Liga seasons
1
Georgia